The University of Pannonia (University of Veszprém until March 1, 2006; Hungarian Pannon Egyetem, formerly known as Veszprémi Egyetem) is a university located in Veszprém, Hungary. It was founded in 1949 and is organized in five faculties: Arts and Humanities, Engineering, Agriculture, Economics and Information Technology.

History and profile
The university was founded in 1949. In the beginning it worked as a regional faculty of the Technical University of Budapest. In 1951, it became independent under the name of Veszprém University of Chemical Engineering. From 1991, the university has been called the University of Veszprém.

The university first offered courses in four areas of Chemical Technology: Oil and Coal Technology, Electrochemical Industry, Inorganic Chemical Technology, Silicate Chemistry. From the mid-1960s two courses — Nuclear Chemistry and Technology, Process Control and System Engineering — became part of the Chemical Engineering education in Veszprém.

The changing and increasing requirements set for the graduates persuaded the university to continually reform and restructure its education activity. As a result, new courses were introduced: agrochemistry in 1970, Chemical Engineering Management in 1973, higher level foreign language teaching in 1983 and Instrumentation and Measurement Techniques in 1984.

The restructuring process accelerated in the past few years and this resulted in the renewal and expansion of the university's education profile.

To respond to the society's growing demand for computer professionals, with the help of external financial support and the university's scientific expertise, the education infrastructure of the Information Technology and Automation courses has been created.

As a result of the increasing openness of Hungary, the need for teachers of foreign languages increased considerably. Having recognized this, the university introduced Teacher Training courses for teachers of English and then for teachers of German and French and the education of philologists in specialties: Hungarian language and literature, theatre sciences. etc. In the meantime, the education of Catholic theologists started in the form of a regional faculty of the Theologic College. Simultaneously, the Faculty of Teacher Training (now: Faculty of Arts) and the Faculty of Engineering were established and the name of the university was changed to University of Veszprém.

The centre of scientific and cultural life, the University of Veszprém with the 200-year-old Georgikon Faculty of Agriculture turned into a three-faculty university on 1 January 2000. On 1 September 2003, two new faculties were created: the Faculty of Economics and the Faculty of Information Technology.

Every year the University of Pannonia hosts national and international research conferences, which strengthen its international reputation. In the near future, the offer will include new faculties and new schools. The leaders of the institution strive to turn the university into the educational, intellectual, and research centre of the Transdanubian region and to help find its place in Europe.

Organization
These are the five faculties:

Faculty of Economic Sciences
Faculty of Engineering
Georgikon Faculty of Agriculture (in Keszthely)
Faculty of Information Technology
Faculty of Modern Philology and Social Sciences (former Faculty of Arts)

Rectors
Károly	Polinszky
Endre Bereczky
Ernő Nemecz	
Károly Polinszky	
Antal László
Pál Káldi	
Ernő Nemecz	
János Inczédy
Bálint Heil
János Liszi
István Győri	
Zoltán Gaál	
Ákos Rédey	
Ferenc Friedler
András Gelencsér (current)

See also
 List of colleges and universities
 Veszprém
 Sándor Dominich

References

External links
University of Pannonia Website 

University of Pannonia
Educational institutions established in 1949
Education in Veszprém County
Buildings and structures in Veszprém County
1949 establishments in Hungary